Liquid Liquid is an American no wave and dance-punk group, originally active from 1980 to 1983.  They are best known for their track "Cavern," which was covered—without proper permission or attribution—by the Sugar Hill Records house band as the backing track for Melle Mel's old school rap classic "White Lines (Don't Don’t Do It)." The group released a series of extended plays, including the acclaimed 1983 12" EP Optimo. In 2008, the band reformed and have played in multiple countries.

History
Liquid Liquid emerged from downtown New York's no wave scene. The group's original records were pressed in very limited quantities on 99 Records, and can now fetch high prices.  "Cavern" originally appeared on the EP, Optimo, recorded by Don Hunerberg.  Though the pressings were small, the music has had a lasting and far reaching impact. A music video for "Cavern" was produced by Michael Sporn.

After "Cavern" was sampled for Grandmaster + Melle Mel's old school rap classic, "White Lines (Don't Don't Do It)," 99 Records took Sugarhill to court over its unauthorized use, and after an expensive court battle, won compensation. Before they could collect, however, Sugarhill went into receivership. The song was also included on the Disco Not Disco compilation album. The first three EPs, plus live material, were reissued in 1997 by Grand Royal (US) and Mo' Wax (UK). After the collapse of both these labels, Domino Records released  the music from all three original 12"s plus extra tracks and early live recordings as Slip In And Out Of Phenomenon in 2008.

In October 2008 the band returned to the UK after a prolonged hiatus, playing at London's Barbican Theatre alongside the Glasgow-based DJ duo Optimo, who named themselves after the eponymous Liquid Liquid song and EP. Liquid Liquid performed in 2009 at the Villette Sonique Festival in Paris, as well as in Lincoln Center, where they followed the 200 Guitar Orchestra. On April 2, 2010, the band performed "Cavern" with The Roots on Late Night with Jimmy Fallon and announced they were to play more shows in Britain, at the Offset Festival and ATP Release The Bats in London. On April 2, 2011, LCD Soundsystem played their farewell gig at Madison Square Garden in New York City with Liquid Liquid as supporting act.

Musical style
Liquid Liquid's music is essentially groove-based and influenced by a variety of sources, including funk, dub reggae, Afrobeat, and punk in its do-it-yourself garage approach. Their songs do not follow standard pop song form, having no defined verses or chorus. Vocalist Salvatore Principato is known to use his voice as an instrument, focusing more on pitch and rhythm than words and lyrics.

Band members
 Salvatore Principato - vocals (1980–1983, 2008–present)
 Dennis Young - guitar, marimba, keyboards (1980–1983, 2008–present)
 Richard McGuire - bass, keyboards (1980–1983, 2008–present)
 Scott Hartley - drums, percussion (1980–1983, 2008–present)

Solo projects
McGuire is a graphic designer and filmmaker. Principato produces remixes and often tours as a DJ and Young plays in various musical projects.

Discography
 Liquid Liquid 12" EP (99-07, 1981)
 Successive Reflexes 12" EP (99-09 1981)
 "Bellhead"/"Push" 7" single (99-11EP7, 1981 - extremely rare record of re-recordings by Liquid Liquid, recorded, mixed & mastered in one day - Nov. 24, 1981. The band destroyed most copies and it was never made available, but some still exist.)
 Optimo 12" EP (99-11, 1983)
 "Dig We Must" 12" (99-LL1, 1984)
 Liquid Liquid 2xLP/CD (Mo Wax/Grand Royal, 1997)
Slip In and Out of Phenomenon 3xLP/CD (Domino Records, 2008)

DJ Bill Bahlman spun his mix of new wave, dance punk and electro at most of Liquid Liquid NYC shows. He also recorded many of these live shows. These live tapes were incorporated into the studio EP's.

References

External links

Liquid Liquid at the Barbican

American post-punk music groups
American post-disco music groups
Musical groups established in 1980
Musical groups disestablished in 1983